The 2019–20 Liga II (also known as 2019–20 Liga II Casa Pariurilor) was the 80th season of the Liga II, the second tier of the Romanian football league system. The season began on 3 August 2019 and ended on 2 August 2020. A total of 20 teams contested the league. It was the fourth Liga II season with a single series. The season was initially scheduled to be played in a round-robin tournament. The first two teams would be promoted to Liga I at the end of the season and the third-placed team would play a play-off match against the 12th-placed team from Liga I. The last five teams would relegate to Liga III.

The season was interrupted on 9 March 2020, after 25 rounds, due to COVID-19 pandemic. After two months of inactivity, on 14 May 2020, the Romanian Football Federation announced that a promotion play-off tournament between the first 6 ranked teams (after 25 rounds) will be played to decide the two teams that will be promoted to Liga I and the third-placed, team that would play another  play-off match against the 12th-placed team from Liga I. No teams will be relegated this season, apart from the clubs that were already dissolved or excluded (Sportul Snagov and Daco-Getica București).

Team changes

To Liga II
Promoted from Liga III
 SCM Gloria Buzău  (debut)
 Rapid București  (after 4 years of absence)
 Turris Turnu Măgurele  (debut)
 CSM Reșița  (after 11 years of absence)
 Miercurea Ciuc  (debut)

Relegated from Liga I
 Dunărea Călărași  (after 1 year of absence)
 Concordia Chiajna  (after 8 years of absence)

From Liga II
Relegated to Liga III
 Luceafărul Oradea  (ended 3-year stay)
 Aerostar Bacău  (ended 1-year stay)
 ACS Poli Timișoara  (ended 1-year stay)
 Balotești  (ended 5-year stay)
 Dacia Unirea Brăila  (ended 9-year stay)

Promoted to Liga I
 Chindia Târgoviște  (ended 4-year stay)
 Academica Clinceni  (ended 7-year stay)

Excluded and spared teams
Luceafărul Oradea withdrew from Liga II on 30 July 2019, with three days before the start of the championship and chose to enroll in the Liga III. Place of Luceafărul was occupied by Energeticianul.

Other changes
Energeticianul was moved from Petroșani to Târgu Jiu, but the club will play its home matches on Municipal Stadium in Drobeta-Turnu Severin, until Tudor Vladimirescu Stadium in Târgu Jiu will be opened.

Renamed teams
CSM Școlar Reșița was renamed as CSM Reșița after recovering its right to use the brand and record of the old entity.

Energeticianul was renamed as Viitorul Târgu Jiu.

Stadiums by capacity

Stadiums by locations

Personnel and kits 

Note: Flags indicate national team as has been defined under FIFA eligibility rules. Players and Managers may hold more than one non-FIFA nationality.

Managerial changes

Regular season

League table

Season results

Promotion play-offs
A promotion play-off tournament between the best 6 teams (after 25 rounds) will be played to decide the two teams that will be promoted to Liga I and the third-placed, team that would play another play-off match against the 12th-placed team from Liga I. The teams started the promotion play-offs with half of the points accumulated until the interruption of the regular season.

Table

Results

Liga I play-off
The 12th-placed team of the Liga I faced the 3rd-placed team of the Liga II

Season statistics
Regular season and promotion play-off overall statistics.

Top scorers

Clean sheets

*Only goalkeepers who played all 90 minutes of a match are taken into consideration.

Attendances

References

2019-20
Rom
2019–20 in Romanian football
Association football events postponed due to the COVID-19 pandemic